The 1970–71 Football League season was Birmingham City Football Club's 68th in the Football League, their 30th in the Second Division, and their first with Freddie Goodwin as manager. They finished in 9th position in the 22-team division. They entered the 1970–71 FA Cup in the third round proper and lost in that round after a replay to Huddersfield Town, and progressed from the first round of the League Cup to the fourth where they were eliminated by Bristol Rovers.

Twenty-six players made at least one appearance in nationally organised first-team competition, and there were twelve different goalscorers. Defender Roger Hynd played in 48 of the 50 first-team matches over the season, and Phil Summerill was leading goalscorer for the third consecutive season.

Football League Second Division

League table (part)

FA Cup

League Cup

Appearances and goals

Numbers in parentheses denote appearances as substitute.
Players with name struck through and marked  left the club during the playing season.
Players with names in italics and marked * were on loan from another club for the whole of their season with Birmingham.

See also
Birmingham City F.C. seasons

References
General
 
 
 Source for match dates and results: 
 Source for lineups, appearances, goalscorers and attendances: Matthews (2010), Complete Record, pp. 376–77.
 Source for kit: 

Specific

Birmingham City F.C. seasons
Birmingham City